Hageman is a Dutch toponymic surname.  The name is likely topographic for someone who lived by an enclosure, from Middle Dutch haghe ‘hedge’, ‘enclosure’ + man ‘man’. Notable people with the surname include:

 Aimé Haegeman (1861–1935), Belgian equestrian
 Casey Hageman (1887–1964), American baseball pitcher
 (1749–1827), Dutch jurist
 Dan Hageman (born 1976), American screenwriter and television producer
 Fred Hageman (born 1937), American football player
 Hans E. Hageman (born c.1957), American lawyer and educator
 Harriet Hageman (1962), American politician
 James Hageman (1930–2006), American politician
 Johanna Hageman (1918–1984), American baseball player
 John Hageman (1918–1968), American railroad man with Hageman clotting factor deficiency
 Kevin Hageman (born 1974), American screenwriter and television producer
 Ra'Shede Hageman (born 1990), American football player
 Richard Hageman (1881–1966), Dutch-born American conductor, pianist, composer and actor

See also
 Hageman (disambiguation) 
 Hagemann, German surname
 Hagman, Swedish surname

References

Dutch-language surnames
Dutch toponymic surnames